Titanic: The Aftermath is a dramatized documentary that focuses on the events that occurred in the lives of the survivors and those who lost people after the sinking of the Titanic. The ninety minute film was made in Halifax, Nova Scotia and first premiered on April 15, 2012. The film was released during the 100th anniversary of the tragedy, and originally aired on the Discovery Channel.

References

2012 television films
2012 films
Films about RMS Titanic